The 1986 Virginia Slims of Houston was a women's tennis tournament played on outdoor clay courts at the Westside Tennis Club in Houston, Texas in the United States and was part of the 1986 WTA Tour. It was the 16th edition of the tournament and was held from May 5 through May 11, 1986. First-seeded Chris Evert-Lloyd won the singles title.

Finals

Singles
 Chris Evert-Lloyd defeated  Kathy Rinaldi 6–4, 2–6, 6–4
 It was Evert-Lloyd's 5th singles title of the year and the 147th of her career.

Doubles
 Chris Evert-Lloyd /  Wendy Turnbull defeated  Elise Burgin /  JoAnne Russell 6–2, 6–4

References

External links
 ITF tournament edition details
 Tournament draws

Virginia Slims of Houston
Virginia Slims of Houston
Virginia Slims of Houston
Virginia Slims of Houston
Virginia Slims of Houston
Virginia Slims of Houston